Clifton Oliver Daniels (born June 30, 1988) is an American crew chief who works for Hendrick Motorsports as the crew chief of their No. 5 Chevrolet Camaro ZL1 in the NASCAR Cup Series driven by Kyle Larson.

Racing career
Cliff Daniels had a short racing career as a driver, racing model cars at short tracks in his home state of Virginia before pursuing a mechanical engineering degree at University of North Carolina at Charlotte. After graduating, he joined RAB Racing in 2011. He then moved to Stewart-Haas Racing, where he served as the race engineer of the No. 14 Chevrolet driven by Tony Stewart from 2013 to 2014. In December 2014, Daniels moved to Hendrick Motorsports to serve as the race engineer of the No. 48 Chevrolet driven by Jimmie Johnson, helping Johnson win the 2016 Sprint Cup Series Championship. Following the 2018 season, Daniels moved to Hendrick's competition systems group before rejoining the No. 48 team at Sonoma in 2019.

On July 29, 2019, following a string of disappointing finishes during the 2019 season, Hendrick Motorsports announced that Daniels would replace Kevin Meendering as the crew chief of the No. 48.

On October 28, 2020, Daniels was announced to become the crew chief for No. 5 of Kyle Larson. The 5 car would replace the No. 48 in 2021.

On March 7, 2021, Daniels earned his first win as a crew chief in the 2021 Pennzoil 400. He won his first championship as a crew chief in 2021 at Phoenix.

On June 14, 2022, Daniels was suspended for four races due to a tire and wheel loss during the Sonoma race.

On March 15, 2023, NASCAR suspended all four Hendrick Motorsports crew chiefs (Daniels, Alan Gustafson, Rudy Fugle and Blake Harris) as well as Kaulig Racing No. 31 car crew chief Trent Owens for four races after it was discovered during practice for the race at Phoenix in March that the hood louvers on all five cars were illegally modified. As a result, each team received an L2 penalty (a loss of 100 driver and owner points as well as the four-race crew chief suspension).

References

External links
 

Living people
People from Isle of Wight County, Virginia
NASCAR crew chiefs
1988 births
University of North Carolina at Charlotte alumni